La Isla is a small wetland, part of the wetlands of Bogotá. It is located next to the Tunjuelo River in the locality Bosa, Bogotá, Colombia.



See also 

Biodiversity of Colombia, Bogotá savanna, Thomas van der Hammen Natural Reserve
Wetlands of Bogotá

References

Further reading

External links 
  Fundación Humedales de Bogotá
  Conozca los 15 humedales de Bogotá - El Tiempo

Wetlands of Bogotá